Jamalpur Junction railway station, station code JMP, is the railway station serving the Munger–Jamalpur twin cities in the Munger district in the Indian State of Bihar.

Location 
Jamalpur Junction is the main railhead for Munger city. Jamalpur Junction is part of the Malda railway division of the Eastern Railway zone of the Indian Railways. Jamalpur Junction is connected to metropolitan areas of India, Sahibganj loop via – route. The station is located about 8 km from Munger city.

Lines 
Traveling south-west, Kiul Junction railway station is the main station next to Jamalpur. Going east,  is the nearest main station. A mega Munger Ganga Bridge connects it to nearby districts like Begusarai, Khagaria and various districts of North Bihar .

Infrastructure 
There are four platforms. The platforms are connected by two foot overbridges and elevators.

It is the first station of the Malda Division to have a Centralised Route Relay Interlocking (CRRI) system.

See also 
 Bhagalpur Junction railway station
 Munger railway station
 Purabsarai railway station

References 

Railway stations in Munger district
Railway junction stations in Bihar
Malda railway division